Triteleia hyacinthina is a species of flowering plant  known by the common names white brodiaea, white tripletlily, hyacinth brodiaea, and fool's onion. It is native to western North America from British Columbia to Idaho to central California. Its habitat includes grassland and vernally moist areas such as meadows and vernal pools. It is a perennial herb growing from a corm. The flower is white, often tinged purple along the tubular throat, with six green-veined tepals. There are six stamens with white, yellow, or occasionally blue anthers.

The bulb is edible but does not smell like an onion.

References

External links
Jepson Manual Treatment
Flora of North America
Washington Burke Museum
Photo gallery

hyacinthina
Flora of the Northwestern United States
Flora of British Columbia
Flora of California
Flora of the Sierra Nevada (United States)
Natural history of the California chaparral and woodlands
Natural history of the California Coast Ranges
Natural history of the Central Valley (California)
Natural history of the San Francisco Bay Area
Plants described in 1886
Flora without expected TNC conservation status